José de Sigüenza (Sigüenza, 1544 - El Escorial, 22 May 1606) was a historian, poet and Spanish theologian from the 722 of Martin.

A Hieronymite monk, de Sigüenza was the prior of the monastery of El Escorial, where he served as both librarian and historian.  He is best known for his works on ecclesiastical history, in particular his History of the Order of St. Jerome (ca.1605), which discusses in detail the construction of El Escorial.

References

Andrés, Gregorio de (1975). Proceso Inquisitorial del padre Sigüenza. Madrid.
Andrés, Gregorio de (1980). «Nuevos datos sobre la genealogía del padre Sigüenza», in La Inquisición Española, Nueva visión, nuevos horizontes, p. 821-829. Madrid.
García de Paz, J.L., AACHE Ediciones – Article about Fray José de Sigüenza.
García López, J., Literatura Española (2008).

Villalba, Luis El padre Sigüenza: su vida y escritos, Madrid (1916)

1544 births
1606 deaths
Spanish Christian monks
16th-century Spanish historians
16th-century Spanish Roman Catholic theologians
Spanish poets
17th-century Spanish Roman Catholic theologians
17th-century Spanish historians